The Syrman goby (Ponticola syrman) is a species of goby native to marine, brackish and probably fresh waters of the Black Sea, the Sea of Azov and the Caspian Sea basins.  They inhabit inshore waters with substrates composed of shell fragments, sand, mud or muddy sand.  This species can reach a length of  TL.

References

Ponticola
Freshwater fish of Europe
Fish of the Caspian Sea
Fish of the Black Sea
Fish of Europe
Fish of Western Asia
Fish described in 1840
Taxa named by Alexander von Nordmann
Taxonomy articles created by Polbot